{| 
|+Ljubljana
{{Infobox ship image
|Ship image=
|Ship caption=Ljubljanas sister ship Beograd (right) and the flotilla leader Dubrovnik (left) in the Bay of Kotor after being captured by Italy
}}

|}Ljubljana was the third and last Beograd-class destroyer built for the Royal Yugoslav Navy (KM) in the late 1930s. She was designed to operate as part of a division led by the flotilla leader .

In 1940, Ljubljana ran aground on a reef off the Yugoslav port of Šibenik, where, badly damaged, she was taken for repairs. Yugoslavia entered World War II when the German-led Axis powers invaded in April 1941, and Ljubljana—still under repair—was captured by the Royal Italian Navy. After repairs were completed, she saw active service in the Royal Italian Navy under the name Lubiana, mainly as a convoy escort on routes between Italy and North Africa. She was lost on 1 April 1943, sources differing as to whether she was sunk by British aircraft, or stranded off the Tunisian coast and declared a total loss.

Background
In the early 1930s, the Royal Yugoslav Navy (КМ) pursued the flotilla leader concept, which involved building large destroyers similar to the World War I Royal Navy V and W-class destroyers. In the interwar French Navy, flotilla leaders were intended to operate as half-flotillas of three ships, or with one flotilla leader operating alongside several smaller destroyers. The KM decided to build three such flotilla leaders—ships that could reach high speeds and would have long endurance. The endurance requirement reflected Yugoslav plans to deploy the flotilla leaders to the central Mediterranean, where they would be able to operate alongside French and British warships. This resulted in the construction of the destroyer  in 1930–1931. Soon after she was ordered, the onset of the Great Depression and attendant economic pressures meant that only one ship of the planned half-flotilla was ever built.

British diplomatic staff reported that although three large destroyers were not going to be built, the intent that Dubrovnik might operate with several smaller destroyers persisted. In 1934, the KM decided to acquire three smaller destroyers to operate in a division led by Dubrovnik, leading to the building of the Beograd class.

Description and construction
The Beograd class was developed from a French design, and the third and last ship of the class, Ljubljana, was built by Jadranska brodogradilišta at Split, Yugoslavia, under French supervision. The shipyard she was constructed in was jointly owned by Yarrow and Chantiers de la Loire. Ljubljanas crew consisted of 145 personnel, including both officers and enlisted men.

The ship was powered by a pair of Parsons steam turbines driving two propellers, using steam generated by three Yarrow water-tube boilers. She carried  of fuel oil.

''Ljubljanas main armament consisted of four Škoda  L/46 guns in single superfiring mounts, two forward of the superstructure and two aft, protected by gun shields. Her secondary armament consisted of four Škoda  anti-aircraft guns in two twin mounts, located on either side of the aft shelter deck. The ship was also equipped with two triple-mount  torpedo tubes and two machine guns. Her fire-control system was provided by the Dutch firm Hazemeyer, and she was fitted with a searchlight. As built, Ljubljana could also carry 30 naval mines.Ljubljana was laid down in 1936, launched on 28 June 1938, and was commissioned into the KM in December 1939.

Career
On 24 January 1940, Ljubljana ran into a reef off the Yugoslav port of Šibenik. The hull side was breached and despite efforts to get the ship into the port, she sank close to shore. Some of the crew swam to safety while others were taken aboard fishing vessels. One of the crew died, and the captain was arrested pending an investigation. The ship was later refloated and towed into Šibenik for major repairs. In April 1941, Yugoslavia was invaded by the Axis powers, and Ljubljana was captured at Šibenik by the Royal Italian Navy on 17 April, where she was still undergoing repairs. The ship was towed to the Bay of Kotor and then to Rijeka for refitting and repair. Her searchlight was replaced with a single mount  gun, and her aft director was also removed. Ljubljanas original 40 mm guns were also removed and five single  L/65 Breda Model 35 guns were added to her armament. Her funnel tops were also cut to a more raked angle.

The ship was commissioned into the Royal Italian Navy under the name Lubiana in October, or November 1942. She served as an escort during 1942–1943, operating on the Tunisian supply route from the beginning of 1943. From 9 February to 22 March 1943, Lubiana participated in a series of troop transport convoys for the German and Italian armies in North Africa. The ship was then involved in escorting another series of convoys to Tunisia commencing on 27 March. Naval history sources vary regarding Lubiana'''s exact fate. According to Roger Chesneau, she was sunk off the Tunisian coast by British aircraft on 1 April 1943, but Maurizio Brescia states the ship was stranded off the Cap Bon Peninsula on the Tunisian coast on the same day and declared a total loss.

Notes

Footnotes

References
 
 
 
 

 
 

 
 
 
 
 
 

Beograd-class destroyers
Naval ships of Yugoslavia captured by Italy during World War II
1938 ships
World War II destroyers of Yugoslavia
Destroyers sunk by aircraft
Ships sunk by British aircraft
Maritime incidents in January 1940
Maritime incidents in April 1943
Ships built in Yugoslavia